Victoria or Vicky Jones may refer to:
Vicky Jones (born 1978), English theatre director and writer
V. M. Jones, children's author
Victoria Jones, a contestant on The One and Only, a 2008 BBC reality contest series
Victoria Jones, a character in Bhowani Junction, a novel by John Masters (also in the film adaptation) 
Vicky Jones (singer), a contestant on the third series of The Voice UK
Vicky Clement-Jones, Hong Kong-born English physician and medical researcher
Vicky Jones (footballer) who played Football at the 2009 Summer Universiade